Linda Louise Layne (born Burbank, California, 1955) is an American anthropologist. She is a visiting fellow at the University of Cambridge in the Reproductive Sociology Research Group (ReproSoc).
Her first book was on tribal and national identities in the Hashemite Kingdom of Jordan.

Layne is completing an edited collection of essays by anthropologists and historians on selfishness and selflessness and working on an in-depth case study of one heterosexual American single mother by choice that explores neoliberal cultures of parenting; and on a comparative study of single mothers by choice, two-mom families, two-dad families, and families that have suffered a pregnancy loss.

Education 
1979–1986 Princeton University. M.A., Ph.D. in Cultural Anthropology and Near Eastern Studies. Dissertation: The Production and Reproduction of Tribal Identity in Jordan.  
1978–1979 Cambridge University. M.Phil. in Social Anthropology. Newnham College. Thesis: Family and  Economic Patterns in Urban Jordan. 
1980, 1981 University of Jordan, Amman, Jordan. Modern Standard Arabic. 
1973–1977 University of Southern California. B.A. cum laude. Individual Major: Anthropology and Political Science. Honors Thesis: Social Transactions Among the Women of Algiers

Selected publications

Books 
2003 Motherhood Lost: A Feminist Account of Pregnancy Loss in America, New York: Routledge
1994 Home and Homeland: The Dialogics of Tribal and National Identities in Jordan, Princeton: Princeton University Press.

Edited volumes and special issues 
2013 Parenting in Global Perspective: Negotiating Ideologies of Kinship, Self and Politics, Charlotte Faircloth, Diane Hoffman and Linda Layne eds. London: Routledge
2012 Understanding Reproductive Loss, Sarah Earle, Carol Komaromy, and Linda Layne, eds.  Ashgate Press
2010 Feminist Technology, Layne, Vostral and Boyer eds. University of Illinois Press
2004 Consuming Motherhood, Taylor, Layne and Wozniak eds. New Brunswick: Rutgers University Press. (featured in Oct 2004 Chronicle for Higher Education). Recipient of the 2005 Council on Anthropology and Reproduction's Best Current Edited Collection Prize)
1999 Transformative Motherhood: On Giving and Getting in a Consumer Culture, ed. Layne. New York: New York University Press. Winner of the 2006 Council on Anthropology and Reproduction “enduring influence” book prize
1998 Anthropological Approaches in Science and Technology Studies Special Issue of Science, Technology and Human Values winter, vol. 23, number 1

Articles in refereed journals
2000 "The Cultural Fix": An Anthropological Contribution to Science and Technology Studies, Science, Technology, and Human Values

References 

1955 births
American anthropologists
Fellows of Girton College, Cambridge
Living people